Wara Thatta Muhammad Shah is a village in Chiniot District, Punjab Province, Pakistan.

Villages in Chiniot District